United Nations Security Council Resolution 164, adopted on July 22, 1961, the Council, in regard to the situation in Tunisia, called for an immediate ceasefire and return of all armed forces to their original positions.

Two days prior to this resolution, Tunisia had called for an urgent meeting of the Security Council to consider its complaint against perceived acts of aggression by France on the sovereignty and security of Tunisia. Since July 19, Bizerte had been under attack by the French Navy and air force; France claimed it was protecting installations and freedom of communications at the site.

The resolution was approved by ten votes to none; France was present but did not participate in the voting.

A majority of Member States requested a special session of the General Assembly to take place between August 21 to 25 to discuss the situation.

See also
History of modern Tunisia
List of United Nations Security Council Resolutions 101 to 200 (1953–1965)

References

External links
 
Text of the Resolution at undocs.org

 0164
 0164
 0164
1961 in Tunisia
1961 in France
July 1961 events